A catholicos (plural: catholicoi) is the head of certain churches in some Eastern Christian traditions. The title implies autocephaly and, in some cases, it is the title of the head of an autonomous church.

The Church of the East, some Oriental Orthodox, Eastern Orthodox, and Eastern Catholic churches historically use this title; for example the Armenian Apostolic Church and the Georgian Orthodox Church. In the Church of the East, the title was given to the church's head, the patriarch of the Church of the East; it is still used in two successor churches, the Assyrian Church of the East and the Ancient Church of the East, the heads of which are known as catholicos-patriarchs. In the Armenian Church there are two catholicoi: the supreme catholicos of Ejmiadzin and the catholicos of Cilicia. The title catholicos-patriarchs is also used by the primate of the Armenian Catholic Church. In India, an autocephalous Oriental Orthodox Church and the regional head of Jacobite Syrian Orthodox Church (an autonomous Church within Syriac Orthodox Church) use this title. The first is the catholicos of the East and Malankara Metropolitan, and the latter the catholicos of India, but unequally same according to the constitution of the Syriac Orthodox Church and the Jacobite Syrian Christian Church.

Origin of the title 
The earliest ecclesiastical use of the title catholicos was by the Bishop of Etchmiadzin, head of the Armenian Apostolic Church, in the 4th century while still under the Patriarchate of Antioch. Among the Armenians, catholicos was originally a simple title for the principal bishop of the country; he was subordinate to the See of Caesarea in Cappadocia.

Sometime later, it was adopted by the Grand metropolitans of Seleucia-Ctesiphon in Persia, who became the designated heads of the Church of the East. The first claim that the bishop of Selucia-Ctesiphon was superior to the other bishoprics and had (using a later term) patriarchal rights was made by Patriarch Papa bar Aggai (c. 317 – c. 329). In the 5th century this was claim strengthened and Isaac (or Ishaq, 399 – c. 410), who organized the Council of Seleucia-Ctesiphon, used the title of bishop of Selucia-Ctesiphon, Catholicos and Head over the bishops of all the Orient. This line of Catholicos founded the Church of the East and the development of the East Syriac Rite.

At the beginning of the fourth century, Albania and Georgia (Iberia) were converted to Christianity, and the principal bishop of each of these countries bore the title of catholicos, although neither of them was autocephalous. They followed the Armenians in rejecting the Council of Chalcedon. At the end of the sixth or beginning of the seventh, century, the Georgian catholicos asserted his independence and accepted Eastern Orthodoxy. Henceforward the Georgian Church underwent the same evolutions as the Greek. In 1783 Georgia was forced to abolish the office of its catholicos, and place itself under the Most Holy Synod of Russia, to which country it was united politically in 1801. The Albanian catholicos remained loyal to the Armenian Church, with the exception of a brief schism towards the end of the sixth century. Shortly afterwards Albania was assimilated partly with Armenia and partly with Georgia. There is no mention of any catholicos in Albania after the seventh century. It is asserted by some that the head of the Abyssinian Church, the abuna, also bears the title of catholicos, but, although this name may have been applied to him by analogy, there is, to our knowledge, no authority for asserting that this title is used by the Abyssinian Church itself.

Catholicos in various Churches

Autocephalous churches of East 
The following are autocephalous churches of East Syriac Rite that claim succession to the catholicos of the East of Selucia-Ctesiphon from the Church of the East. Referred to as Nestorian in Western texts, the term Nestorian was formally renounced in 1976 by Dinkha IV.

Assyrian Church of the East

, Mar Awa III is the catholicos-patriarch of the Assyrian Church of the East. One of the oldest Christian churches, it is a modern successor of the historical Church of the East. It traces its origins to the See of Seleucia-Ctesiphon in central Mesopotamia, which tradition holds was founded by Saint Thomas the Apostle (Tooma Shlikha) as well as Saint Mari and Saint Addai in AD 33 as asserted in the Doctrine of Addai.

It is one of the three Churches of the East that hold themselves distinct from Oriental and Eastern Orthodoxy. The Assyrian Church of the East does not use the word "orthodox" in any of its service books or official correspondence, nor does it use any word which can be translated as "correct faith" or "correct doctrine," the rough translation of "orthodox". The adjectives "holy," "catholic," and "apostolic" were officially added to the Assyrian Church of the East's title in conformance with the Niceno-Constantinopolitan Creed, which declares, "We believe in one, holy, catholic, and apostolic church." In this context, "holy" refers to being set apart for a purely sacred purpose; "apostolic" means founded by one of Jesus's own apostles; and "catholic" is the Greek word for "universal," indicating a worldwide church. In India, it is more often called the Chaldean Syrian Church. In the West it is often called the Nestorian Church, due to its historical associations with Nestorianism, though the church itself considers the term pejorative and argues that this association is incorrect. The church declares that no other church has suffered as many martyrdoms as the Assyrian Church of the East.

The founders of Assyrian theology were Diodorus of Tarsus and Theodore of Mopsuestia, who taught at Antioch. The normative Christology of the Assyrian church was written by Babai the Great (551–628) and is clearly distinct from the accusations directed toward Nestorius: his main Christological work is called the 'Book of the Union', and in it Babai teaches that the two  (essences, or hypostases) are unmingled but everlastingly united in the one  (personality) of Christ.

Ancient Church of the East
, Addai II is the catholicos of the Ancient Church of the East, which split from the Assyrian Church of the East in the 1960s.

Eastern Orthodox Church

Georgian Orthodox Church
The title of catholicos is also used in the Georgian Church, whose head carries the title Catholicos-Patriarch of All Georgia.
 Catholicos of Georgian Orthodox Church
 Ilia II is the current (as of 22 February 2012) Catholicos of the Georgian Orthodox Church.

Oriental Orthodox Churches

Armenian Apostolic Church 
In the Armenian Church there are two catholicoi: the supreme catholicos of Ejmiadzin and the catholicos of Cilicia. The Catholicos of Etchmiadzin presides over the Supreme Spiritual Council of the Armenian Apostolic Church and is the head of the world's 7 million Armenian Orthodox Christians. The primacy of honour of the Catholicossate of Etchmiadzin has always been recognized by the Catholicossate of Cilicia.
 Catholicos of Etchmiadzin (Chief Shepherd and Pontiff to all Armenians dispersed throughout the world) of the Armenian Apostolic Church
 Karekin II is the current catholicos of the Armenian Apostolic Church.
 Catholicossate of the Great House of Cilicia, residing in Antelias, Lebanon
Aram I is the present catholicos of the Great House of Cilicia.

Syriac Orthodox Church
In the seventh century, the Syriac Orthodox Christians who lived in Persia began using the title for its catholicos / maphrian, who was originally the head of the Syriac Orthodox Christian community in Persia. This office ranked second in the Syriac Orthodox church hierarchy after the Syriac Orthodox Patriarch of Antioch, until it was abolished in 1860 and reinstated in the India of the East on 1964.

Today, the title is known as Catholicos / Maphrian of India or Catholicos of India of the Jacobite Syrian Christian Church headquartered at Puthencruz near Kochi in Kerala is an integral branch of Syriac Orthodox Church of Antioch headed by Ignatius Aphrem II Patriarch of Antioch. The current catholicos of the church is Baselios Thomas I.

Malankara Orthodox Syrian Church
According to the constitution of the Malankara Orthodox Syrian Church (Indian Orthodox Church) the head or primate bears the title Catholicos of the East and Malankara Metropolitan. The church is based at Devalokam near Kottayam in Kerala. As of 2021, the current head is Baselios Marthoma Mathews III. He is currently the 9th catholicos of the East since it was relocated to India and 92nd Primate on the Apostolic throne of Saint Thomas.

Ethiopian Orthodox Tewahedo Church
In 1959, the Coptic Orthodox Church of Alexandria granted autocephaly to the Ethiopian Orthodox Tewahedo Church. Abuna Basilios was consecrated the first patriarch-catholicos of the Ethiopian Church by the Coptic Pope Cyril VI at St. Mark's Cathedral in Cairo on 28 June 1959. The title is "Patriarch and Catholicos of Ethiopia, Ichege of the See of St. Tekle Haymanot, Archbishop of Axum".

Catholic Church
Some Eastern Catholic Churches use the title "Catholicos".

Armenian Catholic Church 
The leader of the Armenian Catholic Church (of Armenian Rite), in full communion with the Pope, uses the title "Catholicos".

As of March 14, 2022, Raphaël Bedros XXI Minassian is the catholicos-patriarch of the Armenian Catholic Church. His full title is officially "Catholicos-Patriarch of the House of Cilicia".

Chaldean Catholic Church
The Chaldean Catholic Church (of East Syriac Rite) is in full communion with the Pope. Although derived from the historical Church of the East, whose leader was initially styled Major Metropolitan and Catholicos and later Patriarch (see Church of the East#Organisation and structure), it seems to use only the title of "Patriarch".

, Louis Raphaël I Sako is the Patriarch of Babylon of the Chaldeans.

Syro-Malankara Catholic Church 
The Syro-Malankara Catholic Church of West Syriac Rite in full communion with the Pope is a major archiepiscopal church, a rank granted to the Eastern Catholic Church by Pope John Paul II on 10 February 2005. Accordingly it is headed by Major Archbishop Moran Mor Cardinal Baselios Cleemis Catholica Bava since 2007.

He is referred to as catholicos-patriarch of the Syro Malankara Catholic Church. In this context, the use of the title "Catholicos" indicates parity between him and his peers in the autocephalous Malankara Orthodox Syrian Church and in the Jacobite Syrian Christian Church, which remains part of the Syriac Orthodox Church.

References

Sources
 
 
 
 

Ecclesiastical titles
Eastern Christian ecclesiastical offices
Bishops by type
Syro-Malankara Catholic Church
Christian terminology